Stenodrina is a genus of moths of the family Noctuidae.

Species
 Stenodrina aeschista Boursin, 1937
 Stenodrina agramma Brandt, 1938
 Stenodrina eudiopsis Boursin, 1960
 Stenodrina nitida (Püngeler, 1914)
 Stenodrina paupera (Romanoff, 1885)

References

Natural History Museum Lepidoptera genus database
Stenodrina at funet

Hadeninae